Transport within Singapore is mainly land-based. Many parts of Singapore, including islands such as Sentosa and Jurong Island are accessible by road. The other major form of transportation within Singapore is rail: the Mass Rapid Transit (MRT) which runs the length and width of Singapore, and the Light Rail Transit (LRT) which runs within a few neighbourhoods. The main island of Singapore is connected to the other islands by ferryboat services.

There are two bridges which link Singapore to Malaysia – the Causeway, and the Second Link. The Singapore Changi Airport is a major aviation hub in Asia. Singapore is also notable for being one of the world's busiest transshipment ports.

McKinsey’s Urban Transportation report rank Singapore's transport system world's best overall based on five criteria - availability, affordability, efficiency, convenience, sustainability. Singapore also has one of the most cost-efficient public transport networks in the world, according to a study by London consulting firm Credo, with integrated multi-modal (bus and train) single-journey regular trunk adult card-based fares ranging from S$0.99 to S$2.26, whilst the Monthly Travel Pass (unlimited bus and train rides) is set at S$128 per month.

Public transport (public buses, public MRT and LRT rail networks) is the most common type of transportation within the city-state and public transport is fully integrated by the Land Transport Authority (LTA), with state ownership and public financing of the public infrastructure and public capital assets of railways and buses (whilst the running and maintenance of the railways and buses are tendered to bidding operator companies on contract). 

Private transport (consiting of cars, motorcycles, commercial vehicles) is less commonly used as due to limited land space of the densely-populated country, the Land Transport Authority (LTA) has controlled and limited the private vehicle population in the country, through the Vehicle Quota System (VQS) ownership market-based license auctions since 1990. Due to high taxes such as the Certificate of Entitlement (COE) and Additional Registration Fee (ARF) imposed on private vehicles, private vehicles are prohibitively expensive and Singapore is known to be most expensive country in the world to own a car.

With the emergence of driverless vehicles, Singapore is now among the favourite locations for autonomous vehicles development testing location for the big players in the automotive industry.

Road transport

Buses

Bus transport forms a significant part of public transport in Singapore, with over 4.0 million rides taken per day on average as of 2019. There are more than 365 scheduled bus services, operated by SBS Transit, SMRT Buses, Tower Transit Singapore and Go-Ahead Singapore. There are also around 5,800 buses, majority of which are single-deck and double-deck, and a minority of articulated buses currently in operation.

Since 2016, the Land Transport Authority regulates the public bus service standards and owns relevant assets whereas bus operators bid for operating bus services via competitive tendering, under its Bus Contracting Model.

Taxis and PHVs

Taxis and private hire vehicles (PHV) are a popular form of transport, with fares considered low compared to those in most cities in developed countries. Starting rates were $3.20 - $3.90. As of March 2019, the taxi and private hire car population has been increased to 83,037.

Taxis may be flagged down at any time of the day along any public road outside of the Central Business District (CBD), while private hire cars may be booked via ridesharing apps.

Private cars
As of 2018, there was a total of 957,006 motor vehicles in Singapore, with 509,302 of them being private cars.

Private transport (cars, motorcycles, commercial vehicles) is less commonly used as due to limited land space of the country, the Land Transport Authority (LTA) has limited and controlled the population of privately-owned vehicles in the country, through the Vehicle Quota System (VQS) ownership market-based license auctions since 1990. As a result, private vehicles are prohibitively expensive and Singapore is known to be most expensive country in the world to own a car.; prospective private vehicle owners are required to market bid on a Certificate of Entitlement (COE) sold under auction (valid for 10-years, as of January 2023 COEs are priced at more than S$100,000 for car owners, more than S$75,000 for commercial vehicle owners and more than S$10,000 for motorcycle owners) and pay the Additional Registration Fee (ARF) tax imposed at 100-320% of the open market value (OMV) of the vehicle, among other fees. As a result of the aforementioned taxes, on-the-road car prices in Singapore are approximately 5 times of the on-the-road car prices in Western countries.

Roads and expressways

Singapore pioneered congestion pricing (the market-based usage management of public roads to reduce congestion at specific times within the city centre and certain expressways), with the Singapore Area Licensing Scheme, which has since been replaced with the Electronic Road Pricing, a form of electronic toll collection.
 Total length of expressways: 164 km
 Total length of major arterial roads: 576 km
 Total length of collector roads: 704 km
 Total length of local access roads: 2056 km (as of 2017)

Traffic drives on the left which is typical in Commonwealth countries.

The planning, construction and maintenance of the road network is fully conducted by the Land Transport Authority (LTA), and this extends to expressways in Singapore. These form key transport arteries between the distinct towns and regional centres as laid out in Singapore's urban planning, with the main purpose of allowing vehicles to travel from satellite towns to the city centre and vice versa in the shortest possible distance. These expressways include:
 Ayer Rajah Expressway (AYE)
 Bukit Timah Expressway (BKE)
 Central Expressway (CTE)
 East Coast Parkway (ECP)
 Marina Coastal Expressway (MCE)
 Kallang–Paya Lebar Expressway (KPE)
 Kranji Expressway (KJE)
 Pan Island Expressway (PIE)
 Seletar Expressway (SLE)
 Tampines Expressway (TPE)
 North–South Corridor (scheduled opening in 2026)

The influence of expressways on Singapore's transport policy developed shortly after independence during the history of Singapore because of frequent traffic congestion in the Central district. The aim was to encourage residential development in other parts of the island and give residents in these new "satellite towns" a convenient link between their homes and their workplaces (which were mostly situated around the city centre.)

Causeway and link bridge

Singapore has two land links to Malaysia. The Johor-Singapore Causeway, built in the 1920s to connect Johor Bahru in Johor, Malaysia to Woodlands in Singapore, carries a road and a railway line. The Tuas Second Link, a bridge further west, was completed in 1996 and links Tuas in Singapore to Tanjung Kupang in Johor.

Trishaws
Before World War II, rickshaws were an important part of urban public transportation. In 1947 they were banned on humanitarian grounds, and replaced by trishaws (cycle rickshaws).

Usage of trishaws as a means of transportation had died out by 1983. However, there are some trishaws left which now serve as tourist attractions, taking tourists for a ride around the downtown district.

Rail transport

Mass Rapid Transit (MRT)

The current MRT network consists of six main lines: the North South Line, East West Line, Circle Line and partially-opened Thomson–East Coast Line operated by SMRT Trains (SMRT Corporation) and the North East Line and Downtown Line operated by SBS Transit. Two more lines, the Jurong Region Line and the Cross Island Line, will open in stages from 2027 and 2030 respectively.

Light Rail Transit (LRT)

In several new towns, automated rubber-tyred light rail transit systems function as feeders to the main MRT network in lieu of feeder buses. The first LRT line, which is operated by SMRT Light Rail, opened in Bukit Panjang in 1999 to provide a connection to Choa Chu Kang in neighbouring Choa Chu Kang New Town. Although subsequently hit by over 50 incidents, some of which resulted in several days of system suspension, similar systems albeit from a different company were introduced in Sengkang and Punggol in 2003 and 2005 respectively, both operated by SBS Transit.

International rail links
The international railway line to Malaysia is an extension of the Malaysian rail network operated by Keretapi Tanah Melayu (Malayan Railways). Since 1 July 2011, Woodlands Train Checkpoint serves as the southern terminus of the KTM rail network. Previously, KTM trains terminated at Tanjong Pagar railway station in central Singapore. One more rail link is being planned: the Johor Bahru-Singapore Rapid Transit System between Woodlands North and Bukit Chagar, Johor Bahru.

Air transport

Airlines

The national flag carrier is Singapore Airlines. In total, there are three local airlines, all operating out of Changi Airport:
 Jetstar Asia Airways
 Scoot 
 Singapore Airlines

Malaysia's Firefly is the sole operator with scheduled services out of Seletar Airport.

Airports

The aviation industry is regulated by the Civil Aviation Authority of Singapore, a statutory board of the Singapore government under the Ministry of Transport.

An open skies agreement was concluded with the United Kingdom in October 2007 permitting unrestricted services from Singapore by UK carriers. Singapore carriers were allowed to operate domestic UK services as well as services beyond London Heathrow to a number of destinations, including the United States along with Canada.

Singapore Changi Airport, with its four terminals, is one of the most important air hubs in the region. The international airport is situated at the easternmost tip of the main island, and serves 185 cities in 58 countries. With the recent opening of the fourth terminal, Changi is now capable of handling more than 70 million passengers every year.

Seletar Airport is Singapore's first civil aviation airport and is primarily used for private aviation.

Heliports

Aerial lift transport

Cable car

The Singapore Cable Car is a three-station gondola lift system that plies between Mount Faber on the main island of Singapore and the resort island of Sentosa via HarbourFront. Opened in 1974, it was the first aerial ropeway system in the world to span a harbour. The cable car system underwent a revamp that was completed in August 2010.

In addition, a similar gondola lift system also operates within Sentosa as the Sentosa Line were opened in 2015. This line links Siloso Point to Imbiah.

Maritime transport

Ports and harbours

The Port of Singapore, run by the port operators PSA International (formerly the Port of Singapore Authority) and Jurong Port, is the world's busiest in terms of shipping tonnage handled. 1.04 billion gross tons were handled in 2004, crossing the one billion mark for the first time in Singapore's maritime history. Singapore also emerged as the top port in terms of cargo tonnage handled with 393 million tonnes of cargo in the same year, beating the Port of Rotterdam for the first time in the process. In 2019, it handled a total of 626 million tonnes of cargo.

In 2018, Singapore was ranked second globally in terms of containerised traffic, with 36.6 million Twenty-Foot Equivalent Units (TEUs) handled, and is also the world's busiest hub for transshipment traffic. Additionally, Singapore is the world's largest bunkering hub, with 49.8 million tonnes sold in 2018.

In 2007, the Port of Singapore was ranked the world's busiest port, surpassing Hong Kong and Shanghai. The Port of Singapore is also ranked the Best Seaport in Asia.

Passenger transport

Water transport within the main island is limited to the River Taxi along the Singapore River. The service was introduced in January 2013, with low ridership. There are also daily scheduled ferry services from the Marina South Pier to the Southern Islands such as Kusu Island, Lazarus Island & Saint John's Island and Sisters' Islands. Changi Point Ferry Terminal in the east offers daily ferry services to Pulau Ubin and some destinations in Johor, Malaysia.

Singapore Cruise Centre (SCC) runs Tanah Merah and HarbourFront Ferry Terminals which are connected by ferry services to Indonesian Riau Islands of Batam, Bintan and Karimun.

In addition to the ferry terminals, the Singapore Cruise Centre (SCC) also operates a cruise terminal which is handled by the International Passenger Terminal (IPT), and has two berths of 310 metres and 270 metres with a height limit of 52 metres. It has a draft of 12 metres. It underwent an upgrade in 2005 to improve its passenger handling facilities. An additional cruise terminal, the Marina Bay Cruise Centre Singapore, began construction in 2009 and was completed in 2012 in order to accommodate bigger cruise ships that are not able to dock at the Singapore Cruise Centre.

See also
 Plug-in electric vehicles in Singapore

References

Further reading

External links

 Ministry of Transport
 Public Transport Council
 Land Transport Authority
 TransitLink
 
Taxi Singapore and Transport Guide
traffic management system